Shatgara Mistry Para (সাতগাড়া মিস্ত্রিপাড়া) is a neighborhood of Rangpur city, Bangladesh located near 25.7482N, 89.23974E.

Geography 

This neighborhood is surrounded by Gurati Para and part of Munshi Para to the east, Kerani Para to the west, Munshipara to the south and Guratipara to the north. The soil composition is mainly alluvial soil, similar to other areas of Rangpur. The temperature ranges from 32° to 11° Celsius, and the annual rainfall averages 2931 mm.

Political geography 
this neighborhood is under 
Ward No: 20 (Rangpur City Corporation)
Union: Rangpur City Corporation (Previously Rangpur Sadar)
District: Rangpur
Division: Rangpur
Post Code: 5400
Telephone code: 0521
Population: Approximately 2,000.

Description 
Shatgara Mistry Para is about 0.6 km away from the center of Rangpur city. The neighborhood is approximately 1500 meters long and 2000 meter wide and is populated by 2,000 people. There are two mosques acting as an important landmark for this place. With Several farmlands and buildings this area is treated as a resident area instead of an industrial area.

References

Rangpur District
Municipalities in Rangpur Division